Kvenvær is a fishing village in Hitra municipality in Trøndelag county, Norway.  The village is located on the northwestern coast of the island of Hitra.  It is just south of the Bispøyan islands.  The Kvenvær Church is located in the village.  

Historically, the village was the administrative centre of the old municipality of Kvenvær which existed from 1913 until 1964.

References

Hitra
Villages in Trøndelag